The 1923 Villanova Wildcats football team represented the Villanova University during the 1923 college football season. The Wildcats team captain was Frank Pickett.

Schedule

References

Villanova
Villanova Wildcats football seasons
College football winless seasons
Villanova Wildcats football